Memory is a thriller novel by American writer Donald E. Westlake, published posthumously in April 2010. The novel was written in 1963 and was shopped to publishers by Westlake's then-agent, Scott Meredith, but none of them bought it despite editors praising the novel. In the late 1970s, Westlake's agent, Henry Morrison, thought he could sell the novel, but Westlake declined the offer claiming it was "too dated". The manuscript for Memory was found among Westlake's papers shortly after his death on December 31, 2008. Hard Case Crime bought Memory in 2009, then believed to be the Westlake's final unpublished manuscript, and published it in 2010.

The novel was adapted into the upcoming film The Actor, directed by Duke Johnson and starring André Holland as lead character Paul Cole.

Plot

Actor Paul Cole lost his memory after being violently attacked by a jealous husband who caught Paul with his wife. Stranded in a small town and hounded by police, Paul struggles to get back home in New York and reclaim the life he's lost.

Film adaptation
Director Duke Johnson and producer Abigail Spencer optioned the novel Memory in 2015. On February 24, 2021, Deadline reported that Ryan Gosling had signed on to star in The Actor, with Duke Johnson directing a screenplay he wrote with Stephen Cooney, based on Donald E. Westlake's novel Memory. On October 18, 2022, Spencer said in an interview with the website The Retaility that the film was in pre-production in Budapest with André Holland and Gemma Chan as the leads.

References 

2010 novels
American thriller novels
Novels by Donald E. Westlake
Novels set in Ohio
Novels published posthumously
American novels adapted into films
2010 American novels
Fiction about memory